The L-Shaped Room is a 1962 British drama romance film directed by Bryan Forbes, based on the 1960 novel of the same name by Lynne Reid Banks. It tells the story of Jane Fosset (Leslie Caron), a young French woman, unmarried and pregnant, who moves into a cheap London boarding house, befriending a young man, Toby (Tom Bell), in the building. The work is considered part of the kitchen sink realism school of British drama.

Caron's performance earned her the Golden Globe Award and BAFTA Award for best actress, as well as a nomination for the Academy Award for Best Actress.

Synopsis

A 27-year-old French woman, Jane Fosset (Caron), arrives alone at a run down boarding house in Notting Hill, London, moving into an L-shaped room. Beautiful but withdrawn, she encounters the residents of her house, each a social outsider in his or her own way, including a gay, black trumpeter.

Jane is pregnant and has no desire to marry the father. On her first visit to a doctor, she wants to find out if she really is pregnant and consider her options. The doctor's assumption that she must want either marriage or an abortion annoys her to the extent that Jane determines to have the child. She and Toby (Bell) start a romance which is disrupted when he learns that she is pregnant by a previous lover. They try to work things out but he is also unhappy with his lack of income or success as a writer.

Jane befriends the other residents and they help her when she goes into labour. Toby visits her in the hospital and gives her a copy of his new story, called The L-Shaped Room. After leaving the hospital, Jane journeys home to her parents in France, saying goodbye to the room where she has lived for seven months.

Cast
 Leslie Caron as Jane Fosset
 Tom Bell as Toby
 Brock Peters as Johnny
 Cicely Courtneidge as Mavis
 Bernard Lee as Charlie
 Patricia Phoenix as Sonia
 Emlyn Williams as Dr Weaver
 Avis Bunnage as Doris
 Gerry Duggan as Bert
 Mark Eden as Terry
 Anthony Booth as youth in street
 Harry Locke as newsagent
 Gerald Sim as doctor in hospital
 Nanette Newman as girl at end

Music
Peter Katin's recording of Johannes Brahms's Piano Concerto No. 1 in D minor, Op. 15 is used as the background music, and excerpts occur frequently throughout the film. The original film score was composed by John Barry.

Release

Critical reception
In The New York Times, Bosley Crowther wrote "[Leslie Caron] pours into this role so much powerful feeling, so much heart and understanding, that she imbues a basically threadbare little story with tremendous compassion and charm.The credit, however, is not all Miss Caron's. She must share it with an excellent cast, including Tom Bell, a new actor who plays the writer on a par with her. Particularly she must share it with the remarkable young director Bryan Forbes, who also wrote the screenplay from a novel by Lynne Reid Banks. Mr Forbes is a sometime actor whose first directorial job was last year's beautiful and sensitive Whistle Down the Wind. In this little picture, he has achieved much the same human quality, with shadings of spiritual devotion, as in that."

Awards
 Nominee, Best Actress – Academy Awards (Leslie Caron)
 Winner, Best Actress – Golden Globes (Leslie Caron)
 Winner, Best Actress – BAFTA (Leslie Caron)
 Nominee, Best Picture – BAFTA (Richard Attenborough, Jack Rix, John and James Woolf)
 Selected, Top Ten Films of Year – National Board of Review
 Nominee, Best Actress – New York Film Critics Circle (Leslie Caron)

Popular culture
A recording of the song "Take Me Back to Dear Old Blighty" sung in the film was sampled at the beginning of the title track of the album The Queen Is Dead by The Smiths.

References

External links
 
 
 

1962 films
1962 drama films
1960s pregnancy films
British black-and-white films
British drama films
British Lion Films films
British pregnancy films
1960s English-language films
Films about abortion
Films based on British novels
Films directed by Bryan Forbes
Films featuring a Best Drama Actress Golden Globe-winning performance
Films produced by Richard Attenborough
Films scored by John Barry (composer)
Films set in London
Self-reflexive works
Social realism in film
1960s British films